The Suwon Samsung Bluewings are a South Korean football club based in Suwon that competes in the K League 1, the top tier of South Korean football. Founded in December 1995, they have won the national championship on four occasions (1998, 1999, 2004 and 2008), as well as the Asian Club Championship (the predecessor to the AFC Champions League) twice, in 2000–01 and 2001–02.

History
The club was officially founded in December 1995 by Samsung Electronics, becoming the ninth member of the K League from the 1996 season. It was also the first club to be founded in one specific city, a plan which led to the K-League initiating plans to encourage its other clubs to forge similar links with local communities.

Former South Korean national team manager Kim Ho took charge of the side from their first season in the K-League, and the team finished runners-up in the championship play-off that season. The championship was secured in 1998 and retained in 1999 as Suwon started to dominate Korean football.

Suwon lifted the Asian Club Championship twice in succession in 2000–01 and 2001–02, and also added the Asian Super Cup to their roll of honors on two occasions.

In the 2002 season, Suwon also won the FA Cup for the first time, achieving a continental double.

The departure of Kim Ho in 2003 saw Korean football legend Cha Bum-kun appointed manager ahead of the 2004 season, and the club won its third league title in his debut season as manager.

Suwon finished runners-up in both major domestic competitions in 2006, as Seongnam Ilhwa Chunma claimed victory in the K-League championship play-off final and Chunnam Dragons won in the FA Cup final, thwarting Suwon's attempts to win the first ever domestic double in Korean football.

The 2008 season became one of the most successful seasons in the club's history. Suwon achieved a domestic "double" by winning the K League Championship and the League Cup.

Suwon won the FA Cup five times in the 2002, 2009, 2010, 2016 and 2019, becoming the most winning team in the FA Cup. 
In particular, the 2016 Korean FA Cup final drew attention as it was a Super Match against traditional rival FC Seoul.

Crest and colours

Crest

The current crest has been used by the Bluewings since 2008. It depicts the Hwaseong Fortress, a UNESCO World Heritage Site and a prominent symbol of the city of Suwon.

Colours
The Bluewings' colours are blue, red and white. Blue is the colour of Samsung and also symbolises youth and hope. Red is the symbol of bravery, passion, challenge, vitality and dynamism. White represents benevolence, purity and fair play.

Grounds

Stadium

The Suwon Samsung Bluewings used the 11,808-seat Suwon Sports Complex as their home stadium from 1995 through 2001.

Samsung began building the Suwon World Cup Stadium, the current home of the Bluewings, in 1996, but construction stopped in 1998 due to the 1997 Asian financial crisis. With the support of the city of Suwon and Gyeonggi Province, the stadium was completed in May 2001. It was used as a venue for the 2002 FIFA World Cup.

Based on the shape of the roof of the stadium, fans sometimes call the stadium the "Big Bird".

Training ground
The Bluewings' training ground is located in Dongtan, a district of Hwaseong.

Players

Current squad

Out on loan and military service

Club captains

Notable players
 Hall of Fame
  Seo Jung-won (1999–2004)
  Park Kun-ha (1996–2006)
  Lee Woon-jae (1996–2011)
  Lee Byung-keun (1996–2006)
  Kim Jin-woo (1996–2007)
  Ko Jong-soo (1996–2004)
  Denis Laktionov (1996–2003, 2006–2007)
  Sandro (2000–2002, 2005–2007)
  Nádson (2003–2008)
  Kwak Hee-ju (2003–2013, 2015–2016)
  Natanael Santos (2013–2017)

 Greatest ever team (10th anniversary)
In the spring of 2005, as part of the club's celebration of its 10th anniversary, Suwon fans voted for the best players in the club's history. The players who received the most votes in each position were named in the club's greatest ever team.
 Goalkeeper
  Lee Woon-jae (1996–2011)
 Defenders
  Park Kun-ha (1996–2006)
  Choi Sung-yong (2002–2006)
  Lee Byung-keun (1996–2006)
 Midfielders
  Ko Jong-soo (1996–2004)
  Denis Laktionov (1996–2003, 2006–2007)
  Kim Do-heon (2001–2005, 2009–2014)
  Seo Jung-won (1999–2004)
  Kim Jin-woo (1996–2007)
 Forwards
  Nádson (2003–2008)
  Saša Drakulić (1998–2000)

 Greatest ever team (20th anniversary)
In the spring of 2015, as part of the club's celebration of its 20th anniversary, Suwon fans voted for the best players in the club's history. The players who received the most votes in each position were named in the club's greatest ever team.
 Goalkeeper
  Lee Woon-jae (1996–2011)
 Defenders
  Choi Sung-yong (2002–2006)
  Mato Neretljak (2005–2008, 2011)
  Lee Byung-keun (1996–2006)
  Kwak Hee-ju (2003-2013, 2015–2016)
 Midfielders
  Denis Laktionov (1996–2003, 2006–2007)
  Ko Jong-soo (1996–2004)
  Kim Jin-woo (1996–2007)
  Seo Jung-won (1999–2004)
 Forwards
  Park Kun-ha (1996–2006)
  Nádson (2003–2008)

Honours

Domestic

League
 K League 1
Winners (4): 1998, 1999, 2004, 2008
Runners-up (4): 1996, 2006, 2014, 2015

Cups
 Korean FA Cup
Winners (5): 2002, 2009, 2010, 2016, 2019
Runners-up (3): 1996, 2006, 2011
 Korean League Cup
Winners (6): 1999, 1999s, 2000, 2001, 2005, 2008
 Korean Super Cup
Winners (3): 1999, 2000, 2005

International
 Asian Club Championship
Winners (2): 2000–01, 2001–02
 Asian Cup Winners' Cup
Runners-up (1): 1997–98
 Asian Super Cup
Winners (2): 2001, 2002
 A3 Champions Cup
Winners (1): 2005

Record

 K League Championship results are not counted.
 The 1998, 1999 and 2000 seasons had penalty shoot-outs instead of draws.
 A – Adidas Cup, P – Pro-Specs Cup, PM – Philip Morris Cup, D – Daehan Fire Insurance Cup, S – Samsung Hauzen Cup, PK – Peace Cup Korea, PC – Posco Cup, RC – Rush & Cash CupCW – Asian Cup Winners Cup, CC – Asian Club Championship, SC – Asian Super Cup, CL – AFC Champions League, A3 – A3 Champions Cup, PP – Pan-Pacific Championship, ST – Saitama City Cup

AFC Champions League record
All results (home and away) list Suwon's goal tally first.

Player statistics

Top scorers by seasons

Award winners
The following players have won awards while at Suwon Samsung Bluewings:

Domestic
K League MVP Award
 Ko Jong-soo (1998)
 Nádson (2004)
 Lee Woon-jae (2008)
K League Top Scorer Award
 Saša Drakulić (1999)
 Sandro (2004)
 Natanael Santos (2014)
 Johnathan (2017)
 Adam Taggart (2019)
K League Top Assists Award
 Denis Laktionov (1999)
 Yeom Ki-hun (2015, 2016)
 Lee Ki-je (2022)
K League Best XI
 Yoon Sung-Hyo (1996)
 Pavel Badea (1996)
 Lee Jin-Haeng (1998)
 Ko Jong-Soo (1998, 1999)
 Lee Woon-Jae (1999, 2002, 2004, 2008)
 Shin Hong-Gi (1999)
 Seo Jung-Won (1999, 2001, 2002)
 Denis Laktionov (1999, 2000)
 Saša Drakulić (1998, 1999)
 Sandro Cardoso (2001)
 Javier Martín Musa (2004)
 Kwak Hee-Ju (2004)
 Kim Do-Heon (2004)
 Nádson (2004)
 Cho Won-Hee (2005, 2008)
 Park Ho-Jin (2006)
 Mato Neretljak (2006, 2007, 2008)
 Lee Kwan-Woo (2006, 2007)
 Edu (2008)
 Yeom Ki-hun (2011, 2015, 2017)
 Hong Chul (2014, 2015, 2018, 2019)
 Natanael Santos (2014)
 Kwon Chang-hoon (2015, 2016)
 Johnathan (2017)
 Adam Taggart (2019)
 Lee Ki-je (2021)
K League Young Player of the Year
 Park Kun-ha (1996)
 Ha Tae-kyun (2007)
Korean FA Cup MVP Award
 Seo Jung-won (2002)
 Lee Woon-jae (2009)
 Yeom Ki-hun (2010, 2016)
 Ko Seung-beom (2019)
Korean FA Cup Top Scorer Award
 Denis Laktionov (1996)
 Yeom Ki-hun (2019)

International
AFC Champions League Top Scorer
 José Mota (2010)
AFC Champions League MVP Award
 Zoltan Sabo (2000–01)
AFC Champions League BEST XI
 Dejan Damjanović (2018)
A3 Champion Cup Top Scorer
 Nádson (2005)
 A3 Champions Cup MVP 
 Nádson (2005)

World Cup players
The following players have represented their country at the FIFA World Cup whilst playing for Suwon Samsung Bluewings:

World Cup 1998
 Ko Jong-soo

World Cup 2002
 Lee Woon-jae
 Choi Sung-yong

World Cup 2006
 Lee Woon-jae
 Song Chong-gug
 Cho Won-hee
 Kim Nam-il

World Cup 2010
 Lee Woon-jae
 Yeom Ki-hun

World Cup 2014
 Jung Sung-ryong

World Cup 2018
 Matthew Jurman

Olympic players
The following players have represented their country at the Summer Olympic Games whilst playing for Suwon Samsung Bluewings:

1996
 Ko Jong-soo
 Lee Kyung-soo
 Lee Ki-hyung

2000
 Ko Jong-soo

2004
 Cho Byung-kuk
 Kim Do-heon

2008
 Baek Ji-hoon
 Shin Young-rok

2012
 Jung Sung-ryong

2016
 Kwon Chang-hoon

2020
 An Chan-gi
 Kwon Chang-hoon

Managers

Club officials

Executive Office
 Owner:  Cheil Worldwide (Samsung's subsidiary)
 Principal owner:  Yoo Jeong-keun (President & CEO of Cheil Worldwide)
 Chairman:  Lee Jun
 Director:  Oh Dong-seok

Coaching Staff
 Head coach:  Lee Byung-keun
 Assistant coach:  Choi Sung-yong
 Goalkeeper coach:  Kim Dae-hwan
 First Team coach:  Cho Jae-min
 Reserve Team coach:  Oh Jang-eun
 Physical coach:  Kwon Bo-sung
 Youth academy coach:  Kim Seok-woo (U18)
 Scout:  Lee Kyung-soo
 Scout:  Lee Jong-min

Medical Staff
 Club doctor:  Yoo Hwan-mo
 Assistant club doctor:  Kim Kwang-tae
 Assistant club doctor:  Han Seung-hee

Supporting Staff
 Performance analyst:  Kim Hyung-su
 Kit manager:  Yeop Hyun-soo

Supporters

The Frente Tricolor is the official Suwon Samsung Bluewings supporters group.

Rivalries
 Jijidae derby: vs Anyang LG Cheetahs (1996–2003)
 Super Match: vs FC Seoul (2004–present)
 Magyedaejeon: vs Seongnam Ilhwa Chunma (2000–2013)
 Suwon derby: vs Suwon FC (2005–present)
 Original Classico: vs FC Anyang (2013–present)
 The Siege: vs Jeonbuk Hyundai Motors (2015–present)

Sponsorship

Shirt sponsors and manufacturers

See also
 Suwon Samsung Bluewings Academy
 Suwon World Cup Stadium
 Frente Tricolor
 Samsung Electronics

References

External links

 Suwon Samsung Bluewings Official website 
 FIFA.com – Classic Club: Suwon Samsung Bluewings 

 
Association football clubs established in 1995
K League 1 clubs
Sport in Suwon
Cheil Worldwide
Samsung Sports
1995 establishments in South Korea
Unrelegated association football clubs
Works association football clubs in South Korea
AFC Champions League winning clubs
Asian Super Cup winning clubs